The In Your Area World Tour (also known as Blackpink World Tour [In Your Area]) was the first worldwide concert tour and the second overall by South Korean girl group Blackpink. The tour began on November 10, 2018, in Seoul, South Korea, and ended on February 22, 2020, in Fukuoka, Japan, in support of their albums Square Up (2018) and Kill This Love (2019). The group held 36 shows in 26 cities in 17 countries around the world. The tour is the highest-grossing tour by a Korean girl group.

Background

Blackpink 2018 Tour [In Your Area] Seoul x BC Card
On September 12, it was announced that the group would hold their first concert in Seoul titled "Blackpink 2018 Tour [In Your Area] Seoul x BC Card" on November 11 and November 12 at the Olympic Gymnastics Arena. It was revealed that the title of the tour 'In Your Area' was chosen by the members themselves. Pre-order tickets became available to the group's fan club members on September 14 via Auction Ticket, while tickets were made available to the general public on September 18. Each member of the group played an active role in pitching ideas for the concert. All 20,000 tickets for the two concerts were quickly sold out.

During the two-day concerts at Seoul, member Jennie performed her debut solo song "Solo", which was released later on November 12, 2018, for the first time ever. Blackpink released a 14-track live album that was recorded during the Seoul concerts, Blackpink 2018 Tour In Your Area Seoul, on August 30, 2019.

Blackpink 2019–2020 World Tour [In Your Area]
On October 31, 2018, Blackpink announced their first tour dates for the Asia leg, with dates in Bangkok, Jakarta, Manila, Singapore, and Kuala Lumpur commencing in mid-January 2019. On January 28, 2019, Blackpink officially announced the concert dates and venues for the European leg. The tour kicked off in Amsterdam on May 18, 2019. The group later shared the tour's North America stops, on February 11, 2019, via social media. The North America leg kicked off in Los Angeles on April 17, in between the two weekends of Coachella where the group performed. On February 22, 2019, it was reported that all 60,000 tickets for the group's first North America tour were sold out. Blackpink announced tour dates for Australia on February 25. Kia Motors served as the tour's official sponsor.

On April 15, the group announced they would hold a total of four dome concerts in three cities in Japan, starting with Tokyo on December 4, 2019. On 22 January 2020, it was announced that the tour's last concert at Fukuoka Dome will be broadcast live in 96 movie theaters in Japan to repay the enthusiastic support from fans. A live album, DVD and Blu-ray of the Tokyo Dome concert, Blackpink 2019–2020 World Tour In Your Area – Tokyo Dome –, was released on May 6, 2020. The DVD ranked first on Oricon DVD Weekly Chart (May 4–10).

Concert synopsis
The concert began with a montage of a Rubik's Cube spelling out "Blackpink" and the names of the group's members on the main stage's screen. The cube then turned into an explosion of pink glitter and rising smokes as all members of Blackpink started rising to the stage and performing "Ddu-Du Ddu-Du" in light pink outfits. The quartet was then lifted on stage platforms to perform "Forever Young" with an outer space-like backdrop on screen. After performing the two verses and the second chorus on the main stage, Blackpink was raised on the platforms again and joined by backup dancers as they sang the final part of the song. The group then greeted and introduced themselves to the audience after the platforms were lowered back to the main stage surface level. Afterward, Blackpink performed "Stay" on chairs on the main stage and walked to the B-stage during the final chorus. The group proceeded to sing "Whistle" on the B-stage for a majority of the song before being accompanied by backup dancers and returning to the main stage for the ending part. The group was then lowered down below the stage by lifts for a costume change to prepare for their respective solo stages.

Depending on the tour leg, the order of the solo performances changes. In the first Asian leg, Jisoo would commence the portion by coming out on a platform made of disco balls to sing a cover of "Clarity" by Zedd. Her stage would be followed by Lisa dancing to a medley of songs, both solo and with a group of backup dancers. In Seoul, Lisa danced to "I Like It", "Faded" (by Tink) and "Attention"; the dance number was changed to "Take Me" and "Swalla" from the Bangkok date on January 11, 2019, onwards. Subsequently, after Lisa, Rosé rose to the stage along with Dante Jackson from The Band Six on the piano and sang a cover medley of "Let It Be" by the Beatles, "You and I" by former label mate Park Bom and "Only Look At Me" by Taeyang. From April 17, 2019, to the rest of the tour, Rosé opened the solo stages instead of Jisoo. The solo stage portion then concluded with Jennie performing "Solo" with multiple backup dancers whilst a dance hall setting was on display on the screen. The Band Six played an interlude after Jennie went backstage for her costume change. With an exception to Jennie's performance, the solo segment was revamped for the final leg in Japan. Rosé sang a cover of Lewis Capaldi's "Someone You Loved", Lisa's dance number was changed to a medley of "Good Thing" and "Señorita" while Jisoo performed a cover of AKMU's "How Can I Love the Heartbreak, You're the One I Love".

After the release of "Kill This Love" EP in April 2019, Blackpink opened Act III of the concert with "Kill This Love", dressed in street style outfits. The main screen featured different scenes from the song's official music video, served as the performance backdrop. A group of backup dancers joined Blackpink for the ending beat drop of the song in marching band outfits before leaving the stage for the quartet to perform "Don't Know What To Do" on their own. The group spent some time afterward to talk and interact with the audience. Next, "Kiss and Make Up" was performed with each member standing on their respective raised and moving platform while the screen was showing tropical patterns and imagery. The Band Six and backup dancers later returned to the main stage to accompany Blackpink, now back down on stage level, performing "Really" and "See U Later". They all exited the stage when a video interlude featuring Blackpink racing and drifting in Kia motorcars started playing on the screens.

Blackpink, in sparkly costumes, returned to the stage from below and performed "Playing with Fire" to a gate-like setting on the screen. The background changed to kaleidoscope-like graphics when the group sang "Kick It". They moved to the B-stage and proceeded to perform the final two songs "Boombayah" and "As If It's Your Last" there, after a small talk with the audience.

For the encore, the group reappeared on stage in more casual and sporty clothes to perform a remix version of "Ddu-Du Ddu-Du". Following that performance, Blackpink introduced members of the band and the backup dancer group to the audience and thanked them before casually enjoying an instrumental performance of The Band Six themselves. Only the group remained on stage afterward to sing the final song "Hope Not"; they said goodbye to the audience before exiting the stage on a lift lowering them back down to the pit.

Critical response
The concert received generally positive reviews from the critics. Variety drew comparisons between the all-dancing concert to Beyonce's 2018 Coachella performance, calling it "within the realm of earthly aspirational possibility" with "semi-rigid, semi-relaxed synchronization" and "major charm offensive from four quintessential Girls Next Door". Evan Real writing for The Hollywood Reporter said the girl group delivered "impressive vocals, dancing" that "not even the stage's extravagant light display or frequent bursts of fireworks could pull the group's focus from their exceptionally polished routine". Billboard described the concert as "hugely engaging" and applauded Blackpink's "remarkably natural aura" as opposed to the usual rigidity that K-Pop concerts usually have thanks to the group's improvisations and audience interaction, but also fell short during the solo segment, as they called Lisa's dance number "as baffling as it was boring" and Jisoo's cover of Clarity "uncomfortably close to a filler". The Guardian also shared a similar sentiment about the solo segment and gave the concert three stars out of five, saying while the show had "brilliant moments throughout", it didn't "take enough risks". However, Jan Lee of The Straits Times felt the solo performances were enjoyable and the concert's energy was infectious as he described the members of Blackpink as "exuberant, charming and visually stunning onstage", though he felt the concert in general needed more original material from Blackpink.

Commercial performance
The In Your Area World Tour became the most successful tour by a Korean female group in history. It recorded a 96.6% rate of seat occupancy for the first 32 concerts, excluding the concerts in Japan. Among them, 22 concerts in cities including Bangkok, Jakarta, Manila, Singapore, Kuala Lumpur, Los Angeles, Chicago, Hamilton, Newark, Fort Worth, Paris, Macau, and Melbourne were sold out. All four dome concerts for the Japan leg were also sold out.

Accolades

Setlist
The North American setlist was performed at the May 1, 2019 concert at the Prudential Center in Newark. It does not represent all shows throughout the tour.

Tour dates

Cancelled shows

Personnel 
Blackpink
 Jisoo
 Jennie
 Rosé
 Lisa
Band
 Omar Dominick: Bass
 Dante Jackson: Keyboard
 Justin Lyons: Guitar
 Bennie Rodgers II: Drums

Live albums
Two live albums were released for the In Your Area World Tour: Blackpink 2018 Tour 'In Your Area' Seoul, and Blackpink 2019–2020 World Tour in Your Area – Tokyo Dome.

Blackpink 2018 Tour 'In Your Area' Seoul 

Blackpink 2018 Tour 'In Your Area' Seoul is the second live album of the South Korean music group Blackpink, released on August 8, 2019, on DVD and August 30, 2019, on digital and streaming platforms.

Track listing 
 "Ddu-Du Ddu-Du"
 "Forever Young"
 "Stay" (remix version)
 "Whistle"
 "You & I + Only Look at Me"
 "Solo"
 "Really" (reggae version)
 "See U Later"
 "Playing with Fire"
 "Boombayah"
 "As If It's Your Last"
 "Whistle" (remix version)
 "Ddu-Du Ddu-Du" (remix version)
 "Stay"

Blackpink 2019–2020 World Tour in Your Area – Tokyo Dome 

Blackpink 2019–2020 World Tour in Your Area – Tokyo Dome is the third live album of the South Korean music group Blackpink, released on May 14, 2020.

Track listing 
 "Ddu-Du Ddu-Du" (Japanese version)
 "Forever Young" (Japanese version)
 "Stay" (Japanese version, remix)
 "Whistle" (Japanese version)
 "Kill This Love" (Japanese version)
 "Don't Know What to Do" (Japanese version)
 "Really" (Japanese version)
 "See U Later" (Japanese version)
 "Playing with Fire" (Japanese version)
 "Kick It" (Japanese version)
 "Boombayah" (Japanese version)
 "As If It's Your Last" (Japanese version)

Gallery

References

Blackpink concert tours
2018 concert tours
2019 concert tours
2020 concert tours
Concert tours of North America
Concert tours of the United States
Concert tours of Canada
Concert tours of Oceania
Concert tours of Europe
Concert tours of Australia
Concert tours of Asia
Concert tours of South Korea
Concert tours of Indonesia
Concert tours of Hong Kong
Concert tours of the Philippines
Concert tours of Singapore
Concert tours of Malaysia
Concert tours of Taiwan
Concert tours of the Netherlands
Concert tours of the United Kingdom
Concert tours of Germany
Concert tours of France
Concert tours of Spain
Concert tours of Thailand
Concert tours of Japan